Franz Simón Gonzales Mejía (born 26 June 2000) is a Bolivian football player who plays as midfielder for Oriente Petrolero.

International career
He made his national team debut on 9 October 2020 in a World Cup qualifier game against Brazil.

References

External links
 

2000 births
Living people
Bolivian footballers
Bolivian expatriate footballers
Association football midfielders
Bolivia youth international footballers
Bolivia international footballers
Sportspeople from Cochabamba
Bolivia under-20 international footballers
Bolivian Primera División players
Argentine Primera División players
Club Aurora players
Sport Boys Warnes players
The Strongest players
C.D. Palmaflor del Trópico players
Real Santa Cruz players
Oriente Petrolero players
Club Atlético Platense footballers
Bolivian expatriate sportspeople in Argentina
Expatriate footballers in Argentina